Jacopo Melani (6 July 1623 – 18 August 1676) was an Italian composer and violinist of the Baroque era. He was born and died in Pistoia, and was the brother of composer Alessandro Melani and singer Atto Melani.

Works
1655-6: Intermedi (with La donna più costante), Florence, Cocomero
1657: Il potestà di Colognole (La Tancia) (libretto G. A. Moniglia), dramma civile rusticale, Florence, Teatro della Pergola  
1657: Scipione in Cartagine (libretto Moniglia?), dramma musicale, Florence, Cocomero
1658: Il pazzo per forza (libretto G. A. Moniglia), dramma civile rusticale, Florence, Teatro della Pergola
1659: Il vecchio balordo (Il vecchio burlato) (libretto Moniglia), dramma civile, Florence, Teatro della Pergola
1661: Ercole in Tebe (libretto G. A. Moniglia), festa teatrale, Florence, Teatro della Pergola
1663: Amor vuol inganno (La vedova, ovvero Amor vuol inganno) (libretto G. A. Moniglia), dramma civile, Florence
1668: Girello (libretto Filippo Acciaiuoli), dramma musicale burlesco with a prologue by Alessandro Stradella, Rome, Palazzo Colonna
1669: Il ritorno d'Ulisse (libretto Moniglia), dramma musicale, Pisa, Palazzo dei Medici
1670: Enea in Italia (libretto Moniglia), dramma musicale, Pisa, Palazzo dei Medici
1674: Tacere et amare (libretto Moniglia), dramma civile musicale, Florence, Cocomero

References
 The Viking Opera Guide edited by Amanda Holden. London 1993.

External links
Operone biography page

1623 births
1676 deaths
Italian Baroque composers
Italian male classical composers
Italian opera composers
Male opera composers
People from Pistoia
17th-century Italian composers
17th-century male musicians